The Tornabuoni Altarpiece (Italian - Pala Tornabuoni) is a tempera on panel painting by Domenico Ghirlandaio and his studio as the high altarpiece for the Tornabuoni Chapel in Santa Maria Novella. It was begun around 1490 and completed around 1498, four years after the painter's death. It is now split between several museums, with the central panel and two others now in the Alte Pinakothek in Munich.

Panels
Madonna in Glory with Saints, Saint Catherine of Siena and Saint Laurence, Alte Pinakothek, Munich
Resurrection (reverse), Gemäldegalerie, Berlin
Saint Stephen, Museum of Fine Arts, Budapest
St Peter Martyr, Fondazione Magnani Rocca, Traversetolo (province of Parma)
Saint Vincenzo Ferrer and Saint Anthony of Padua, previously Kaiser-Friedrich-Museum, Berlin, destroyed in May 1945 in the burning of the Flakturm Friedrichshain

External links
http://www.wga.hu/frames-e.html?/html/g/ghirland/domenico/7panel/11pala1.html
https://www.mfab.hu/artworks/saint-stephen-protomartyr/

1490s paintings
Paintings by Domenico Ghirlandaio
Paintings in the Gemäldegalerie, Berlin
Paintings in the collection of the Museum of Fine Arts (Budapest)
Paintings in the collection of the Magnani-Rocca Foundation
Altarpieces
Angels in art
Books in art
Paintings of the Madonna and Child
Paintings of Catherine of Siena
Paintings depicting Saint Peter
Paintings of Peter of Verona
Paintings of Saint Stephen
Paintings of Anthony of Padua